Oddanchatram is a town in Dindigul district in the Indian state of Tamil Nadu. Oddanchatram is a  region in the southwest of Tamil Nadu. The Town was carved out of Madurai District in 1985. Oddanchatram is also famous for vegetable and cattle market. As of 2011, the town had a population of 30,064. It is known as vegetable city of Tamil Nadu. Oddanchatram vegetable market is the largest supplying of vegetables in  Tamilnadu  and Kerala. Agriculture is the major economic support for the town.

Geography
It is located at the base of the western ghats in South India. Water body - Parapalar Dam

Demographics
According to 2011 census, Oddanchatram had a population of 30,064 with a gender-ratio of 994 females for every 1,000 males, much above the national average of 929. A total of 2,676 were under the age of six, constituting 1,378 males and 1,298 females. Scheduled Castes and Scheduled Tribes accounted for 20.3% and 0.06% of the population respectively. The average literacy of the town was 77.11%, compared to the national average of 72.99%. The town had a total of 8,046 households. There were a total of 12,738 workers, comprising 1,127 cultivators, 1,983 main agricultural labourers, 164 in house hold industries, 9,048 other workers, 416 marginal workers, 9 marginal cultivators, 134 marginal agricultural labourers, 16 marginal workers in household industries and 257 other marginal workers.

Economics
Oddanchatram is popular for Gandhi Vegetable market, which is one of the largest vegetable market in Tamilnadu. The market is situated near Oddanchatram bus stand. Agricultural industry provides major employment for the local people. Workers from various neighboring towns migrate to Oddanchatram Taluk, mainly from the month of June to December. This migration takes place during the peak seasons.

Politics
As per 2016, totally 2,23,628 (1,10,979 Males, 1,12,643 Females & 6 Others) voters are in Oddanchatram Constituency.

Oddanchatram (state assembly constituency) is part of Dindigul (Lok Sabha constituency). Oddanchatram elects one MLA to the legislative assembly of the State. R. Sakkarapani from Dravida Munnetra Kazhagam party was elected as the MLA from 1991 to 2021 for 6 terms.

Transport

Road
The following are the major highways connecting Oddanchatram :
SH-152 : Oddanchatram - Vadamadurai
SH-37 : Oddanchatram - Dharapuram - Tiruppur
NH-83 : Coimbatore - Oddanchatram- Nagapattinam
SH-341 : Oddanchatram - Pachalur - Kodaikanal

National Highway NH 83 connects Coimbatore to Nagapattinam via Oddanchatram
Tiruchirappalli Thanjavur. TNSTC buses connect the town to other parts of the state. Oddanchatram is the main centre for all places connecting Palani, Dharapuram, Madurai, Dindigul, Theni, Coimbatore. KSRTC buses like Kottayam, Kozhikode, Kasaragod, Guruvayur, Ernakulam, Thrissur, Palakkad buses are available at particular interval of time from Oddanchatram bus stand. KSRTC buses like Mysore are available at night.

It has bypass road to connect dgl and Palani road.

Railways
Station Code : ODC
ODDANCHATRAM is a part of the Coimbatore-Rameswaram MG line prior to the commencing of gauge conversion. On 20 November 2012, the Dindigul-Palani section of the line was completed, and the local railway station opened to railway traffic again. Currently passenger trains are running between Madurai, Thiruchendur, Coimbatore, Palakkad. And a daily express train is available between Oddanchatram to Chennai.

Airways
The nearest major airports are:
Coimbatore International Airport located 100 km from Oddanchatram.
Madurai International Airport located at 90 km from Oddanchatram.
Tiruchirappalli International Airport located at 134 km from Oddanchatram.

Education
Govt Schools:
There are two govt schools in oddanchatram, which are K.R.Matric Higher Secondary School and Govt girls Matric Higher Secondary Schools. 

Private Schools:
There are several private schools in Oddanchatram, which includes Christian Matric Hr Sec School, which is oldest english medium and first private school in Oddanchatram. Built by Late Dr.Jacob Cherian,Padma Bhushan Awardee in 1999.The Health and educational institutions built by Dr.Jacob Cherian are now managed by Christian Charitable Trust.

Other schools include Sri Krishna Matric Hr Sec School, Akshaya Acedemy Matric/CBSE Hr Sec School, Holy Cross Matric Hr Sec School, Buds Matriculation Hr Sec School and few small schools.

Engineering Colleges:
There is one engineering College in Oddanchatram, which is Christian Engineering College(Affliated to Anna University) Built by Late Dr.Jacob Cherian and Managed by Christian Charitable trust.

References

External links
 Oddanchtram municipality

Cities and towns in Dindigul district